Magi Dodd was a Welsh radio presenter and producer, best known for her work at BBC Radio Cymru.

Career 

As a presenter, Dodd was a familiar voice on Radio Cymru's nighver, before becoming one of its main presenters, hosting the flagship 8-10pm slot on weeknights. She was regularly heard presenting alongside former Big Brother contestant Glyn Wise.

Dodd went onto host her own hour-long nightly show, Dodd Com, streamed exclusively on the C2 website with a midnight repeat on Radio Cymru.

In later years, Dodd concentrated her work on producing shows for the Welsh language radio network, such as Bore Cothi, the Radio Cymru 2 breakfast show and the award-winning Llais y Maes, as part of live coverage of the National Eisteddfod.

Dodd continued to co-present Radio Cymru's annual pop quiz for Welsh-medium schools and led a series of radio production workshops for students as part of the station's schools tours. She also provided radio commentary for the Cân i Gymru song contest.

Personal life 

Originally from Pontypridd, Dodd attended Ysgol Gyfun Rhydfelen (now Ysgol Garth Olwg) in Rhydyfelin and studied at Aberystwyth University.

She later lived in the Grangetown area of Cardiff.

In a 2009 interview with the quarterly music magazine Y Selar, Dodd explained she grew up in a bilingual home, where her mother listened to Welsh music. She described listening to Welsh rock bands such as Jess and Beganifs in the 1990s as a real eyeopener.

On 22 September 2021, the BBC announced Dodd had died, at the age of 44.

Radio Cymru's managing editor, Dafydd Meredydd - who was one of Dodd's co-presenters on C2 - described her as full of energy, enthusiasm, creative ideas and such an important part of the team for over 20 years.

References

External links 
BBC Radio Cymru - C2 - Magi Dodd - in the Internet Archive
BBC Radio Cymru - C2 - Magi Dodd interview - in the Internet Archive

1977 births
2021 deaths
People from Pontypridd
Welsh-language broadcasters
Welsh women radio presenters
Welsh radio presenters